Dumpukht - Aatish-e-Ishq is a Pakistani television social drama series co-produced by Kashif Nisar and Moomal Entertainment. Directed by Nisar, it is written by Zafar Mairaj and features Nauman Ijaz, Sonia Mishal and Bilal Abbas Khan in lead roles. It first aired on 13 July 2016 on A-Plus TV.

Synopsis 
"Dumpukht" is a cooking technique in which rice, meat and vegetables are cooked on a low flame in a dough sealed pot. Thus, the story revolves around the passion of love which faces societal pressure and foreign heat and in return creates fire which cause destruction.

It focuses that how mystical practices, in the name of holiness ruin the lives of normal people.

Plot 
The plot revolves around a conservative household who has firm belief on the Peer babas and follow Peer Habib Ullah in every matter be it business matter or personal one. The daughter of elder brother, Kulsoom is preparing for her exams and goes to Mehar Nigar's house for tuition. Mehar Nigar, who is Kulsoom's tutor is worried about her son Bilal, who is living with his father since the age of 12 years. Mehar Nigar wants to bring back her son and remains worried about him. Due to her sadness about son, Kulsoom decideds to takes a taweez from Peer Sahab as she has the same views about this as of her household but Mehar Nigar does not  think on the same way.

Cast 

 Sonia Mishal as Kulsoom
 Nauman Ijaz as Peer Habib Ullah: Peer sahab of Kulsoom's family
 Bilal Abbas Khan as Bilal “Billu”: son of Kulsoom's teacher, Mehar Nigar
 Saman Ansari as Noor Bano “Bibi Saheba”: Peer Sahab's wife
 Asma Abbas as Tahira: Kulsoom's mother
 Anjum Habibi as Kulsoom's father
 Aamna Malick as Nimmo: Kulsoom's cousin
 Munazzah Arif as Rabia: Nimmo's mother

 Haseeb Khan as Nimmo's father
 Saqib Sameer as Haroon
 Saba Faisal as Mehar Nigar: Kulsoom's tuition teacher and Billu's mother

Accolades

References

External links

Pakistani television shows